Peter Stefura (February 13, 1923 – August 16, 1982) was a farmer, a municipal councilor and Reeve (both in Lamont, Alberta) and served as a Canadian federal politician from 1957 to 1958.

Stefura first ran for a seat in the House of Commons of Canada in the 1957 federal election. He defeated 4 other candidates to win the Vegreville. Parliament was dissolved 1 year later and he ran for re-election in the 1958 federal election but was defeated by Progressive Conservative Frank Fane, whom Stefura had defeated 1 year earlier. Stefura attempted to win his seat and defeat Fane in the 1962 federal election but was not successful.

He died at St. Mary's Hospital in Camrose in 1982.

References

External links
 

1923 births
Members of the House of Commons of Canada from Alberta
Social Credit Party of Canada MPs
1982 deaths
People from Lamont, Alberta